Mirosław Nahacz (1984–2007) was a Polish novelist and screenwriter born in Gorlice. He majored in cultural studies at the University of Warsaw.

Career
In 2003, at the age of eighteen, Nahacz published his first novel Osiem Cztery (Eight Four). That same year he wrote monthly a column to the Filipinka magazine and cooperated with the Lampa magazine, and was awarded the Natalia Gall and the Ryszard Pollak Literary Fund Award and moved to Warsaw. His next book, Bombel (2004), received critical acclaim, with critics calling him "a voice of the generation".

In 2005, Nahacz wrote Bocian and Lola (2005). His last book titled Niezwykłe przygody Roberta Robura (2009), was finished just days before his disappearance in July 2007.

Nahacz stated that his writing was influenced by the literature of Céline, Hrabal, Burroughs and Pynchon.

Nahacz was the co-author of the screenplay Egzamin z Życia ('The Exam of a Life') broadcast on channel TVP2 of the public Polish Television.

Death
On July 24, 2007, at the age of 22, Nahacz was found dead in the basement of his Warsaw flat. He had disappeared and committed suicide by hanging a few days earlier.

Works
Osiem cztery (novel; Czarne 2003)
Bombel (novel; Czarne 2004)
Bocian i Lola (novel; Czarne 2005)
Niezwykłe przygody Roberta Robura (novel; Warszawa: Prószyński, 2009;

References

External links
Article about Nahacz 
Review of "Osiem cztery" in Gazeta Wyborcza 
Review of "Bocian i Lola" in Gazeta Wyborcza 

1984 births
2007 suicides
Eastern Orthodox Christians from Poland
21st-century Polish novelists
Polish male novelists
Suicides by hanging in Poland
21st-century Polish male writers
20th-century Polish screenwriters
Male screenwriters
20th-century Polish male writers